Louis Rabinowitz may refer to:

 Louis Isaac Rabinowitz (1906–1984), Orthodox rabbi, historian and philologist
 Louis M. Rabinowitz (1887–1957), American businessman, philanthropist and art collector